Viva! is a British animal rights group, which focuses on promoting veganism. It was founded by Juliet Gellatley in 1994. Viva! carries out undercover investigations to expose the abuse of factory farmed animals and produces information on how to go vegan, including recipes and shopping guides. It is a registered charity.

Overview

Viva! is an animal rights' campaigning organisation, working on issues such as factory farming and slaughter and is based in Bristol, with a branch office in Poland. Campaigns include End Factory Farming, Eat Green, Foie-Gras free Britain, Exotic Meat, Ban the Farrowing Crate, Dark Side of Dairy and youth campaigns including The Big Coverup. Campaigns in 2018 included an investigation into Hogwood Pig Farm in Warwickshire, and Scary Dairy's "Trash" campaign, highlighting the dairy industry's forgotten victims: male calves.

Events
Following on from its success with the former biannual national "Incredible Vegan Roadshow" in London, Viva! now organises six annual festivals across the UK designed to help people become vegetarian or vegan. These are: Bristol Viva! Vegan Festival, Cardiff Viva! Vegan Festival, Swansea Viva! Vegan Festival, Stockport Viva! Vegan Festival, Birmingham Viva! Vegan Festival and Coventry Viva! Vegan Festival. Viva! also do a number of outreach events each year to raise awareness and support of its current campaigns.

Celebrity endorsement
Viva! enjoys the patronage of numerous entertainers, including Martin Shaw, Heather Mills, Michael Mansfield QC, Jerome Flynn, Hayley Mills and Paul McCartney.

In the press
In 2009, Viva! criticised supermarket chain Tesco for turning 5,000 tonnes of meat that had passed its sell-by date into electricity by burning it to avoid wasting the meat.

In 2012, Viva! stated that it favoured the development of cultured meat. "Certainly, with over 950 million land animals slaughtered in the UK each year, and the vast majority of them factory farmed in awful conditions, anything that saves animals from suffering is to be welcomed," former Viva! spokesman and campaign manager Justin Kerswell said, adding that individuals should make up their own mind on whether or not they would consume it themselves, because 'vegetarianism and veganism aren't religions'.

In 2022, Viva! ran a TV advert which showed a couple ordering pulled pork takeaway from a company called "Just Meat." When the takeaway arrives, it is a live piglet delivered with a meat cleaver.

See also 
2010 Nocton Dairies controversy
Viva! Health
 List of animal rights groups

References

External links

Viva! ratuje konie – Polish website of the organisation

1994 establishments in the United Kingdom
Animal rights organizations
Animal welfare organisations based in the United Kingdom
Organisations based in Bristol
Vegan organizations
Vegetarian organizations